Friedrich Ritter von Röth (1894–1918) was a German First World War fighter ace credited with 28 confirmed aerial victories, 20 of which were observation balloons. The observation balloons were extremely hazardous to attack; they were fleeting targets hooked to motors to draw them rapidly earthward to safety when threatened. They were also ringed with pre-sighted antiaircraft guns, and their vicinity was patrolled by fighter units. Röth was notable as the premier balloon buster of the Imperial German Air Service. Notably, he eschewed single victories over the gasbags, once downing a pair, three times destroying a trio, once a quartet—and on 29 May 1918, he torched five observation balloons within 15 minutes. Overall, Röth made his first ten victories with Jagdstaffel 23 before transferring to Jagdstaffel 16 for his remaining 18 victories.

The victory list

Friedrich Ritter von Röth's victories are reported in chronological order, which is not necessarily the order or dates the victories were confirmed by headquarters.

This list is complete for entries, though obviously not for all details. Background data was abstracted from Above the Lines: The Aces and Fighter Units of the German Air Service, Naval Air Service and Flanders Marine Corps, 1914–1918, pp. 192–193; and The Aerodrome webpage on Friedrich Ritter von Röth . Added facts are individually cited. Abbreviations were expanded by the editor creating this list.

Endnotes

References

Aerial victories of Röth, Friedrich Ritter von
Röth, Friedrich Ritter von